Daniel Benjamin Mayr (born July 28, 1995) is a German professional basketball player who plays for ART Giants Düsseldorf of the ProA. Standing at 2.18 m (7 ft 2 in), he plays at the center position.

Professional career

Early years
He made his first tries on the basketball pitch with the Dragons Rhöndorf. Being 11 years old, he already stood an impressing 1.78 m (5 ft 10 in). In 2008, he moved to Science City Jena. He stayed in the club for six seasons and played in various leagues.

Bayern Munich
On July 17, 2014, he signed a four-year contract with Bayern Munich and primarily played for the club's development squad in the third division (ProB).

Fraport Skyliners
On July 6, 2016, he signed with Fraport Skyliners.

EN Baskets Schwelm
On May 6, 2019, he signed with EN Baskets Schwelm of the German 3rd tier ProB.

wiha Panthers Schwenningen
On June 28, 2022, he signed with Panthers Schwenningen of the German 2nd tier ProA.

ART Giants Düsseldorf
On January 10, 2023, he signed with ART Giants Düsseldorf of the German 2nd tier ProA.

Career statistics

EuroLeague

|-
| style="text-align:left;"| 2015–16
| style="text-align:left;"| FC Bayern Munich
| 0 || 1 || 15.5 || .500 || .000 || .250 || 2.0 || .0 || .0 || .0 || 1.0 || .0
|- class="sortbottom"
| colspan=2 style="text-align:center;" | Career
| 0 || 1 || 15.5 || .500 || .000 || .000 || 2.0 || .0 || .0 || .0 || 1.0 || .0

BARMER 2. Basketball Bundesliga ProA

|-
| style="text-align:left;"| 2022-2023
| style="text-align:left;"| wiha Panthers Schwenningen
| 15 || na || 17:19 || .565 || .000 || .424 || 3.9 || .4 || .3 || .8 || 4.4 || 5.7
|- class="sortbottom"
| colspan=2 style="text-align:center;" | Career
| 15 || na || 17:19 || .565 || .000 || .424 || 3.9 || .4 || .3 || .8 || 4.4 || 5.7

Personal 
He is the son of former basketball player Rolf "Bibo" Mayr who stands 7 ft 4 in (2.22 m) tall and who won three caps for the German Men's National Team in 1989.

References

External links
 Daniel Mayr at beko-bbl.de
 Daniel Mayr at draftexpress.com
 Daniel Mayr at eurobasket.com
 Daniel Mayr at euroleague.net

1995 births
Living people
Centers (basketball)
FC Bayern Munich basketball players
Skyliners Frankfurt players
Science City Jena players
Sportspeople from Bonn
ART Giants Düsseldorf players